Track of the Cat is a studio album by the American singer Dionne Warwick. It was released by Warner Bros. Records in 1975 in the United States. Her second album to be released that year, it peaked at number 137 on the US Top LPs & Tape chart.

Critical reception

AllMusic editor Ron Wynn found that Warwick "didn't get it on this 1975 release, as songs like 'Love Me One More Time' and 'Jealousy' were tentatively sung, burdened with unimpressive lyrics, or poorly produced."

Track listing
All tracks produced by Thom Bell.

Personnel and credits 
Credits adapted from the liner notes of Track of the Cat.

Musicians

Dionne Warwick –  vocals
Bobby Eli –  guitar
Bob Babbitt –  bass
Thom Bell –  keyboards, arrangements, conductor
 Tony Bell –  guitar
 Carla Benson – backing vocals
 Evette Benton – backing vocals
 Charles Collins – drums
 Bruce Hawes – backing vocals
 Carl Helm – backing vocals
 Barbara Ingram – backing vocals
 Joseph Jefferson – backing vocals
 MFSB –  horns, strings
 Andrew Smith – drums
 Larry Washington –  percussion, congas

Technical

Don Murray –  chief engineer
Albert Watson –  front cover photography

Charts

References

Dionne Warwick albums
1975 albums
albums produced by Thom Bell
albums recorded at Sigma Sound Studios